The 1982 Hardy Cup was the 1982 edition of the Canadian intermediate senior ice hockey championship.

Final
Best of 5
Georgetown 4 Quesnel 2
Georgetown 3 Quesnel 2
Georgetown 4 Quesnel 1
Georgetown Raiders beat Quesnel Kangaroos 3-0 on series.

External links
Hockey Canada

Hardy Cup
Hardy